Tiffany Ann Rea (born October 27, 1996) is an American beauty pageant titleholder from Tehachapi, California, who was crowned Miss United States 2020. Rea previously held the titles of Miss California United States 2020 and Miss Kern County United States 2020.

References 

Living people
1996 births
People from California
American beauty pageant winners